Maksim Savostikov (born 13 August 1998) is a Belarusian professional footballer. As of 2020, he plays for Smolevichi.

References

External links 
 
 

1998 births
Living people
Belarusian footballers
Association football defenders
FC Dinamo Minsk players
FC Belshina Bobruisk players
FC Oshmyany players
FC Krumkachy Minsk players
FC Viktoryja Marjina Horka players
FC Smolevichi players